Itinda is a census town in the Basirhat I CD block in the  Basirhat subdivision of the North 24 Parganas district in the state of West Bengal, India.

Geography

Location

Area overview
The area shown in the map is a part of the Ichhamati-Raimangal Plain, located in the lower Ganges Delta. It contains soil of mature black or brownish loam to recent alluvium. Numerous rivers, creeks and khals criss-cross the area. The tip of the Sundarbans National Park is visible in the lower part of the map (shown in green but not marked). The larger full screen map shows the full forest area. A large section of the area is a part of the Sundarbans settlements. The densely populated area is an overwhelmingly rural area. Only 12.96% of the population lives in the urban areas and 87.04% of the population lives in the rural areas.

Note: The map alongside presents some of the notable locations in the subdivision. All places marked in the map are linked in the larger full screen map.

Demographics
According to the 2011 Census of India, Itinda had a total population of 8,679, of which 4,467 (51%) were males and 4,212 (49%) were females. Population in the age range 0–6 years was 1,130. The total number of literate persons in  Itinda was 5,650 (74.84% of the population over 6 years).

Infrastructure
According to the District Census Handbook, North Twenty Four Parganas,  2011, Itinda covered an area of 1.3315 km2. The protected water-supply involved overhead tanks, service reservoir, tap water from treated, untreated sources. It had 722 domestic electric connections. Among the medical facilities it had 1 nursing home, 1 veterinary hospital, 1 charitable hospital/ nursing home, 7 medicine shops. Among the educational facilities, it had 3 primary schools, 3 middle schools, 1 senior secondary school, 1 general degree college. It is well-known for paddy, jute, oilseeds.

References

Cities and towns in North 24 Parganas district